Dakshina Kannada Lok Sabha constituency formerly Mangalore Lok Sabha constituency is one of the 28 Lok Sabha (lower house of the Indian parliament) constituencies in Karnataka, a state in southern India.This constituency is closer to Kerala.  This constituency was created as a part of the delimitation of the parliamentary constituencies in 2008.  It first held elections in 2009 and its first member of parliament (MP) was Nalin Kumar Kateel of the Bharatiya Janata Party (BJP). As of the latest elections in 2019, Kateel represents this constituency. It comprises whole area of Dakshina Kannada district only.

Assembly segments
Before delimitation in 2008, Belthangady Assembly segment was under Chikmagalur constituency and the Bantwal, Moodabidri Assembly segments, along with former Surathkal Assembly segment (now renamed as Mangalore City North) were under the Udupi constituency. In addition, the entire Kodagu district, comprising Madikeri, Virajpet and Somwarpet Assembly segments, was under the former Mangalore Lok Sabha constituency. After delimitation, Ullal and Mangalore Assembly segments were also renamed as Mangalore and Mangalore City South. As of 2019, Dakshina Kannada Lok Sabha constituency comprises the following Vidhan Sabha (legislative assembly) segments:

Members of Parliament

Election results

General election 2019

General election 2014

General election 2009

See also 
 Dakshina Kannada district
 List of Constituencies of the Lok Sabha
 Mangalore Lok Sabha constituency

References

External links
Dakshina Kannada lok sabha  constituency election 2019 date and schedule

Lok Sabha constituencies in Karnataka
Dakshina Kannada district